Pakistan Poverty Alleviation Fund (PPAF) is a Pakistani Not-for-Profit company based on the model of public-private partnership. PPAF aims to promote an effective approach to poverty alleviation across Pakistan. A number of leading multilateral, bilateral, and international corporate institutions such as the World Bank contribute to PPAF’s poverty reduction goal by providing financial support and funds to promote grassroot development. This 'Fund' mostly helps by providing microfinance loans (very small loans) to the very poor households to help lift them out of poverty.

Achievements and recognition
Pakistan Poverty Alleviation Fund (PPAF) is the leading agency for poverty reduction in Pakistan.
 In 2017, 'PPAF' won the Outstanding Achievement Award at the Global Diversity & Inclusion Benchmarks (GDIB) Conference held in Karachi, Pakistan

Government of Pakistan also provides large amounts of money every year from its budget (Pakistani Rupees 1.584 Billion granted in 2016) to Pakistan Poverty Alleviation Fund. Large Pakistani corporations and wealthy individuals in Pakistan also contribute to the 'Fund'.

See also
 Balochistan Rural Support Programme
 Sarhad Rural Support Programme

References

External links
 Pakistan Poverty Alleviation Fund official website
 A documentary on Balochistan Development Project in 2005 with the funds of Pakistan Poverty Alleviation Fund on YouTube
 An interview with Qazi Azmat Isa - CEO, Pakistan Poverty Alleviation Fund
Non-profit organisations based in Pakistan
Poverty in Pakistan